The 2003–04 Süper Lig was the 46th league season, and the third season of Süper Lig. Fenerbahçe won their 15th title, being 4 points ahead Trabzonspor. Since Turkey dropped from eighth to tenth place in the UEFA association coefficient rankings at the end of the 2002–03 season, the league has lost two of its UEFA Cup berths.

An extremely dramatic final fixture took place, because in the relegation places, there were four teams. Bursaspor, with 37 points, İstanbulspor with 38, Çaykur Rizespor and Akçaabat Sebatspor with 39. İstanbulspor, managed by Aykut Kocaman, won 2-0 away at Konya over Konyaspor, Çaykur Rizespor defeated Beşiktaş 1-0, and Akçaabat Sebatspor beaten Ankaragücü 3-2. Bursaspor, defeating 1-0 Samsunspor reached the 40 points, but they were relegated.

Final league table

Results

Top scorers

References
Extensive data about Turkish Super League can be found at the pages of Alper Duruk.

Süper Lig seasons
Turkey
1